Maverick Square is a section of the neighborhood of East Boston in Boston, Massachusetts, United States.  It is East Boston's oldest commercial center. At the heart of the square is Maverick Station, which is part of the Blue Line of the MBTA.

In 2010, a revitalization of Maverick Square began.  
 	
The nearby Maverick public housing project – once a source of urban blight that gave the area the reputation as the most crime-ridden in the neighborhood – has been redeveloped by Trinity Financial and the East Boston Community Development Corporation. The razing of crime-ridden high-rises, reintroduction of the urban street grid removed in the 1940s, and construction of individual homes with privates access, combined with mixed-income home ownership, contribute to the area's revitalization.

References

See also
 Central Square
 Day Square
 Maverick (MBTA station)
 Maverick National Bank
 Orient Heights

East Boston
Neighborhoods in Boston
Squares in Boston